House of Goudarz or Goudarzian (گودرزیان) is an important Iranian family in Shahnameh and Persian mythology. They are descendants of Kave the Blacksmith. Gooderzian is also sometimes known as free man, meaning he does not want to be defeated or captured.

The Role of the Goudarz Family
The House of Goudarz plays an important role in many parts of Shahnameh. They have a lot of power before Kay Kavus. Their power and influence decrease when Kay Kavus ascent to throne, in favor of House of Nowzar. Before Kay Kavus, they were spahbeds of Iranian army and also, they were standard-bearer of Iran in wars, but after him, these responsibilities were passed to the House of Nowzar. At the time of Kay Khosrow, their power increased once again. According to Toqyan-e Sakayi, Afghanestanian writer, there is a power struggle between the House of Goudarz and the House of Nowzar in Shahnameh. Rostam and Siavash favored the House of Goudarz and Kay Kavus and Fariburz favored the House of Nowzar. Goudarz, the leading member of the family played a vital role in the story of Davazdah Rokh war. His son, Giv and his grandson, Bizhan also have important roles in the story of Kay Khosrow and the story of Bizhan and Manizhe respectively.

They are relatives of the House of Rostam. Rostam, the most important Iranian hero in Shahnameh, has married with the daughter of Goudarz. Giv, an important member of the House of Goudarz, also has married Rostam's daughter, Banu Goshasp.

Family tree

References

Sources
Ferdowsi Shahnameh. From the Moscow version. Mohammed Publishing.

External links

Shahnameh
Persian mythology
Places in Shahnameh